Brockmeyer v. Dun & Bradstreet 113 Wis. 2d 561, 335 N.W.2d 834 (Wis. 1983), was a case in which the Wisconsin Supreme Court first identified that Wisconsin has some judicial exceptions to the employment at will doctrine.

Facts
Charles J. Brockmeyer was employed at investment firm Dun & Bradstreet as a district manager of credit services, though he lacked a formal employment contract. After the employer settled a sex discrimination suit filed by the employee's former secretary, with whom he allegedly had an affair, the employer fired the employee. The court held that it was appropriate to create a public policy exception to the employment-at-will doctrine, as the termination had clearly violated a well-defined public policy, as evidenced by existing law. While the employer's actions may have constituted bad faith, they did not contravene the policies of any statute or constitutional provision. As the employee failed to prove that his discharge violated fundamental public policy, the decision for the employer was appropriate.

Holding
The court affirmed the decision of the lower court in favor of the employer.

Citations
The case is cited in Bammert v. Don's Super Valu, Inc.

References

External links

United States labor case law
Wisconsin state case law
Dun & Bradstreet
1983 in United States case law
1983 in Wisconsin
United States lawsuits